James Colin Martin (2 December 1898 – 1969) was a footballer who played in the Football League for Aberdare Athletic, Blackpool, Bristol City, Halifax Town, Reading, Southend United, Wolverhampton Wanderers and Stoke.

Career
Martin was born in Stoke-upon-Trent started his career with local clubs Stoke St Peter's and Basford before joining Football League club Stoke in 1919. He played 19 matches for the club and scored just the one goal which came in a 2–0 win over Nottingham Forest in the 1919–20 season. He left in 1921 and joined Welsh side Aberdare Athletic where he impressed scoring 34 goals in 76 league matches, this prompted Wolverhampton Wanderers to sign Martin in 1923. He struggled to settle at Wolves left for Reading before re-joining Aberdare and then on to Bristol City.

Martin joined Harry Evans' Blackpool in 1928. He made his debut for the club on 6 October, in a 4–2 victory at Clapton Orient, scoring two of the visitors' goals. He played in the three games that followed, before being sold to Southend United. He then played for Halifax Town before ending his career with Congleton Town.

Career statistics
Source:

References

English footballers
Aberdare Athletic F.C. players
Blackpool F.C. players
Bristol City F.C. players
Halifax Town A.F.C. players
Stoke City F.C. players
Southend United F.C. players
Wolverhampton Wanderers F.C. players
Congleton Town F.C. players
English Football League players
1898 births
1969 deaths
Reading F.C. players
Association football forwards